Princess Marie Louise of Schleswig-Holstein  (Franziska Josepha Louise Augusta Marie Christina Helena; 12 August 1872 – 8 December 1956) was a granddaughter of Queen Victoria.

Early life
Princess Marie Louise was born at Cumberland Lodge in Windsor Great Park. By birth, she was member of the House of Schleswig-Holstein-Sonderburg-Augustenburg. Her father was Prince Christian of Schleswig-Holstein-Sonderburg-Augustenburg, the third son of Duke Christian of Schleswig-Holstein-Sonderburg-Augustenburg and Countess Louise of Danneskjold-Samsøe. Her mother was Princess Helena of the United Kingdom, the fifth child and third daughter of Queen Victoria and Prince Albert of Saxe-Coburg-Gotha. She was baptized on 18 September 1872. Her godparents were Emperor Franz Joseph of Austria and Queen Marie of Hanover.

Her parents resided in the United Kingdom, and the Princess was considered a member of the British Royal Family. Under Royal Warrant of 15 May 1867, the children of Prince and Princess Christian were to be styled "Highness".  From her birth in 1872 therefore Princess Marie Louise was styled Her Highness Princess Marie Louise of Schleswig-Holstein, albeit only in the United Kingdom.  She was known to her family as "Louie".

She was a bridesmaid at the 1885 wedding of her maternal aunt Princess Beatrice,  to Prince Henry of Battenberg.

Marriage
On 6 July 1891, Princess Marie Louise married Prince Aribert of Anhalt (18 June 1866 – 24 December 1933) at St. George's Chapel in Windsor Castle. Prince Aribert was the third son of Frederick I, Duke of Anhalt, and his wife, Princess Antoinette of Saxe-Altenburg. The bride's first cousin, the German Emperor Wilhelm II, had been instrumental in arranging the match.

Though contemporary sources did not directly suggest it was a cause of his marriage dissolution, a number of contemporaries and subsequent historical accounts suggest Aribert was bisexual or homosexual, and some have suggested an indiscretion with a male attendant was the catalyst for the dissolution and that the marriage had never been consummated. The marriage was annulled on 13 December 1900 by his father. Princess Marie Louise, on an official visit to Canada at the time, immediately returned to Britain. According to her memoirs, she regarded her marriage vows as binding, so she never remarried.

Activities, charity and patronages

After the annulment, Princess Marie Louise devoted herself to charitable organisations and patronage of the arts. She inspired the creation of Queen Mary's Dolls' House to showcase the work of British craftsmen. She established the Girl's Club in Bermondsey that served as a hospital during World War I. She was also active in the work of the Princess Christian Nursing Home at Windsor. She took part in all official occasions of the royal family, including coronations and funerals and processed as a princess of the blood royal at events such as the coronation of George VI and the carriage procession for princesses of the blood royal at the coronation of Elizabeth II.

Scouting

In 1919 the Wolf Cub pack from the 4th Streatham Scout Group, met Princess Marie Louise on her visit to Streatham, South London. The group provided her with a guard of honour for her visit to Streatham. She was so impressed with the group and their high standards, that she declared the group as her own, and it has since been known as the 4th Streatham Sea Scout Group (Princess Marie Louise's Own).

World War I
In July 1917, when George V changed the name of the British Royal House from the House of Saxe-Coburg-Gotha to House of Windsor, he also ordered his numerous cousins and in-laws, who were British subjects, to discontinue the use of their German titles, styles, and surnames.  Never taking other titles or surnames, Princess Marie Louise and her unmarried sister, Princess Helena Victoria, became known simply as "HH Princess Marie Louise" and "HH Princess Helena Victoria", giving them the odd distinction of being princesses but not, apparently, members of any particular royal family. This approach differed from the one accepted by George V's other relatives, who relinquished all princely titles, not just their German designations, and in turn received British titles of nobility from the King. Their titles of Princess were derived from their father, and they were not officially princesses of the United Kingdom. However, their unmarried status and their right to be styled Highness dating from Queen Victoria's concession of 1867 rendered their situations awkward, so that it was easier to allow them to retain their status as princesses while avoiding the question of immediate family membership altogether.

Later life
Princess Marie Louise became a godmother of Prince Richard of Gloucester in 1944. She was called "Cousin Louie" by a young Princess Elizabeth, and attended her wedding alongside her sister, Princess Helena Victoria. She attended four coronations in Westminster Abbey, those of King Edward VII and Queen Alexandra in 1902; King George V and Queen Mary in 1911; King George VI and Queen Elizabeth in 1937; and Queen Elizabeth II in 1953. In 1956, she published her memoirs, My Memories of Six Reigns. She died at her London home, 10 Fitzmaurice Place, Berkeley Square, a few months later on 8 December 1956 and is buried at the Royal Burial Ground, Frogmore at Windsor Great Park. At the time of her death, she was one of six surviving grandchildren of Queen Victoria. Probate of the Princess's estate was granted on 12 March 1957 and was valued at £107,644 (£1.8 million at 2022 conversion rates).

Titles, styles and honours

Titles and styles
1872–1891: Her Highness Princess Marie Louise of Schleswig-Holstein
1891–1900: Her Highness Princess Aribert of Anhalt
1900–1917: Her Highness Princess Marie Louise of Schleswig-Holstein
1917–1956: Her Highness Princess Marie Louise

Honours
VA: Lady of the Royal Order of Victoria and Albert, Second Class
CI: Lady of the Order of the Crown of India
GCVO: Dame Grand Cross of the Royal Victorian Order (1953)
GBE: Dame Grand Cross of the Order of the British Empire (1919)
RRC: Member of the Royal Red Cross

Ancestry

Notes

Sources
Ronald Allison and Sarah Riddell, eds., The Royal Encyclopedia (London: Macmillan, 1992).
Marlene A. Eilers, Queen Victoria's Descendants (New York: Atlantic International Publishing, 1987).
Princess Marie Louise (née Princess of Schleswig-Holstein-Sonderburg-Augustenberg), My Memories of Six Reigns (London: Evans Brothers, 1956).
"Obituary: Princess Marie Louise, Patron of Social Services," The Times 10 December 1956, p. 14.

British princesses
House of Augustenburg
Companions of the Order of the Crown of India
Dames Grand Cross of the Order of the British Empire
Dames Grand Cross of the Royal Victorian Order
Double dames
1872 births
1956 deaths
People from Old Windsor
Princesses of Schleswig-Holstein-Sonderburg-Augustenburg
House of Ascania
Burials at the Royal Burial Ground, Frogmore
Royal reburials
British royal memoirists